Bullockus is a genus of sea snails, marine gastropod mollusks in the family Fasciolariidae, the spindle snails, the tulip snails and their allies.

Species
Species within the genus Bullockus include:

 Bullockus guesti Lyons & Snyder, 2008
 Bullockus honkeri (Snyder, 2006)
 Bullockus mcmurrayi (Clench & Aguayo, 1941)
 Bullockus pseudovarai Lyons & Snyder, 2008
 Bullockus varai (Bullock, 1970)

References

External links
 W.G. & Snyder M.A. (2008). New genera and species of Peristerniinae (Gastropoda: Fasciolariidae) from the Caribbean region, with comments on the fasciolariid fauna of Bermuda. The Veliger. 50(3): 225-240

Fasciolariidae